Talk to Her is a 2002 Spanish drama written and directed by Pedro Almodóvar, and starring Javier Cámara, Darío Grandinetti, Leonor Watling, Geraldine Chaplin, and Rosario Flores. The film follows two men who form an unlikely friendship as they care for two women who are both in comas.

The film was a critical and commercial success, winning the BAFTA for Best Film Not in the English Language and the Golden Globe for Best Foreign Language Film while Almodóvar won the Academy Award for Best Original Screenplay. It is generally regarded as one of the best films of the 2000s.

Plot
The story unfolds in flashbacks, giving details of two separate relationships that become intertwined.

At a performance of Café Müller, a dance-theatre piece by Pina Bausch, Benigno Martín and Marco Zuluaga are seated next to each other. They are strangers, but Benigno notices the tears on Marco's face at one point during the performance.

Marco is a journalist and travel writer who sees a TV interview with Lydia González, a famous matador. He thinks that an article about her would be interesting and contacts her in a bar, where she asks him to take her home. The news that she has broken up with her boyfriend "el Niño de Valencia", another matador, has been all over the tabloids. When Marco confesses that he is a journalist who knows nothing about bullfighting, she becomes angry and abruptly exits his car outside her house. He starts to drive off but stops when he hears a scream from inside her house. Lydia rushes out and gets into his car. Marco goes inside to kill the snake, an act that leaves him weeping. Having shared some vulnerability, they become friends and, later on, lovers. Marco attends a wedding and is surprised to see Lydia there, since she had said that she did not want to go. The wedding is that of Marco's former fiancée, Ángela, who had the same phobia of snakes as Lydia; Marco had been very much in love with Ángela and had difficulty getting over her, which was why he wept over things he could not share with her. Lydia says that she has something important to say, but she prefers to wait until after the bullfight that afternoon, during which she is gored and becomes comatose. Marco remains by her side at the hospital and befriends Benigno, who recognizes him from the theatre performance. A doctor tells Marco that, while there are miracle-stories of people who have come out of comas, there is no reason for him to remain hopeful about Lydia.

Benigno is obsessed with Alicia Roncero, a beautiful dancer whom he watches practicing in the studio that he can see into from the apartment where he lives with his invalid mother. To care for her, he became a nurse and a beautician. After his mother dies, he finds the courage to talk to Alicia when she drops her wallet on the street. As they walk to her house, she talks about dancing and her enjoyment of silent black and white films. When she enters her building, Benigno notices that it is also the office of Dr. Roncero, a psychiatrist. As a ruse to gain access to Alicia's apartment, Benigno makes an appointment to see the doctor. In response to the doctor's questions, Benigno talks about the years he cared for his mother and says that he is lonely and a virgin. Afterward, a shocked Alicia sees him leaving her room, from which he has taken a hair clip. That night she is struck by a car and becomes comatose. In the hospital, where Benigno is assigned to care for Alicia, he talks to her as if she were awake and brings her dancing and silent film mementos. He tells Marco that he should talk to Lydia because, even when in a coma, women understand men's problems. In response to Dr. Roncero's questioning, Benigno says that he is gay, presumably so that the doctor will not be suspicious of his intimate care of Alicia.

"El Niño de Valencia", whom Marco finds in Lydia's room one day, tells Marco that Lydia and he had reconciled, that before the goring incident she intended to tell Marco that. He also says that, now that he has recovered from his own injuries, he should be the one attending to Lydia. Marco goes into Alicia's room and starts opening his heart to her. When Benigno appears, he tells Marco that he always thought Marco and Lydia would separate. A nurse expresses concern that Alicia has not had a period in two months and appears bloated. In the hospital parking lot, Benigno tells Marco of his desire to marry Alicia. Marco is taken aback, pointing out that Alicia cannot express her will in any way. Benigno remains unpersuaded.

The hospital staff discover that Alicia is pregnant because she was raped. Further investigation reveals that her chart does not indicate her missed period. Benigno admits to falsifying the chart and claims that he did this so as not to alarm anyone, as other comatose patients have also missed their periods. Another orderly reports having overheard Benigno's conversation with Marco about wanting to marry Alicia.

Unaware of Alicia's pregnancy, Marco leaves for Jordan to write a travel book. Months later, he reads in a newspaper that Lydia has died without awakening from her coma. When he calls the hospital to talk to Benigno, a nurse tells him that Benigno is in prison for Alicia's rape and urges him to return for Benigno’s sake because “he has no one.” Benigno, who has been denied information about Alicia since his imprisonment, asks Marco to find out what has happened to her. Marco stays in Benigno's apartment, from which he sees Alicia in the dance studio doing rehab exercises with her teacher, Katrina. From Benigno's lawyer, Marco learns that Alicia had a stillborn baby. The lawyer urges him not to tell Benigno about the baby or Alicia's recovery.

Marco, who adheres to this request, receives a voicemail from Benigno saying that he cannot live without Alicia and has decided to "take off.” Marco rushes to the prison, where Benigno has left him a farewell letter. Benigno had written that he hopes to take only enough pills to leave him in a comatose state in which he can join Alicia. He asks Marco to talk to him and tell him everything. Marco visits Benigno's grave and tells him about the stillbirth and Alicia’s recovery.

The film ends in the theatre where it began, with Alicia and Katrina sitting a few rows behind Marco at the dance performance. During intermission, Alicia asks a distraught-looking Marco if he is alright. When the performance continues, Marco is seen turning back to look at a smiling Alicia and, echoing a caption that had appeared for the couples "Marco y Lydia" and "Benigno y Alicia," the words “Marco y Alicia” appear on the screen.

Cast
 Javier Cámara as Benigno Martín
 Darío Grandinetti as Marco Zuluaga
 Leonor Watling as Alicia Roncero
 Rosario Flores as Lydia González
 Mariola Fuentes as Rosa
 Geraldine Chaplin as Katerina Bilova
 Pina Bausch as herself dancing in Café Müller
 Malou Airaudo as 'Café Müller' dancer
 Caetano Veloso as himself singing "Cucurrucucú paloma" at a party
 Roberto Álvarez as Doctor
 Elena Anaya as Ángela
 Lola Dueñas as Matilde
 Adolfo Fernández as Niño de Valencia
 Ana Fernández as Lydia's sister
 Chus Lampreave as Caretaker
 Paz Vega as Amparo (in silent film)
 Cecilia Roth as Party guest (cameo)
 Marisa Paredes as Party guest (cameo)

Reception

Critical response 
On Rotten Tomatoes the film has a "Certified Fresh" approval rating of 91% based on reviews from 136 critics, and an average rating of 8.10/10. The website's consensus states: "Another masterful, compassionate work from Pedro Almodóvar". On Metacritic, the film has a weighted average score of 86 out of 100, based on reviews from 34 critics, indicating "universal acclaim".

Roger Ebert of the Chicago Sun-Times gave it 4 out of 4 and wrote: "Combines improbable melodrama (gored bullfighters, comatose ballerinas) with subtly kinky bedside vigils and sensational denouements, and yet at the end, we are undeniably touched." A.O. Scott of the New York Times named Talk to Her "The best film of the year".

The film grossed $9,285,469 in the United States and $41,716,081 internationally for a worldwide total of $51,001,550.

Accolades
Talk to Her wasn't submitted as Spain's pick for the Academy Award for Best Foreign Language Film. Mondays in the Sun was selected instead.

Wins
 2002 Academy Awards:
 Best Original Screenplay - Pedro Almodóvar
 Argentine Film Critics Association ("Silver Condor"): Best Foreign Film
 2003 BAFTA Awards:
 Best Film Not in the English Language
 Best Original Screenplay - Pedro Almodóvar
 2003 Bangkok International Film Festival ("Golden Kinnaree Award"): Best Film, Best Director - Pedro Almodóvar
 Bodil Awards: Best Non-American Film
 Bogey Awards: Bogey Award
 Cinema Brazil Grand Prize: Best Foreign Language Film
 Cinema Writers Circle Awards (Spain): Best Original Score - Alberto Iglesias
 Czech Lions: Best Foreign Language Film
 2003 César Awards: Best European Union Film
 European Film Awards: Best Film, Best Director (Pedro Almodóvar), Best Screenwriter - Pedro Almodóvar
 French Syndicate of Cinema Critics: Best Foreign Film
 2003 Golden Globe Awards:
 Best Foreign Language Film
 Goya Awards (Spain): Best Original Score - Alberto Iglesias
 Los Angeles Film Critics Association: Best Director - Pedro Almodóvar
 Mexican Cinema Journalists ("Silver Goddess"): Best Foreign Film
 National Board of Review: Best Foreign Language Film
 Russian Guild of Film Critics ("Golden Aries"): Best Foreign Film
 Satellite Awards: Best Motion Picture: Foreign Language, Best Original Screenplay - Pedro Almodóvar
 Sofia International Film Festival: Audience Award – Best Film
 Spanish Actors Union: Performance in a Minor Role: Female - Mariola Fuentes
 TIME Magazine: Best Film
 Uruguayan Film Critics Association: Best Film (tie)
 Vancouver Film Critics Circle: Best Foreign Film

Nominations
 2002 Academy Awards:
 Best Director - Pedro Almodóvar
 British Independent Film Awards: Best Foreign Film – Foreign Language
 Broadcast Film Critics Association Awards: Best Foreign Language Film
 Chicago Film Critics Association: Best Foreign Language Film
 David di Donatello Awards: Best Foreign Film
 European Film Awards: Best Actor (Javier Cámara), Best Cinematographer - Javier Aguirresarobe
 Satellite Awards: Best Director - Pedro Almodóvar

Legacy
In 2005, Time magazine film critics Richard Corliss and Richard Schickel included Talk to Her in their list of the All-TIME 100 Greatest Movies. Paul Schrader placed the film at #46 on his canon of the 60 greatest films. Sight & Sound magazine included the film in its list of "30 great films of the 2000s". In a 2016 BBC poll, critics voted the film the 28th greatest since 2000.

References

External links
 
 
 
 
 

2002 films
2002 comedy-drama films
Spanish comedy-drama films
2000s Spanish-language films
Films directed by Pedro Almodóvar
Films about gender
Films set in Jordan
Films set in Madrid
Best Foreign Language Film Golden Globe winners
Films shot in Madrid
Films whose writer won the Best Original Screenplay Academy Award
Spanish nonlinear narrative films
Best Foreign Language Film BAFTA Award winners
Bullfighting films
European Film Awards winners (films)
Films whose writer won the Best Original Screenplay BAFTA Award
Films scored by Alberto Iglesias
Films shot in Almería
Films produced by Agustín Almodóvar
BAFTA winners (films)
Sony Pictures Classics films
El Deseo films
2000s Spanish films